The Federated Millers and Mill Employees' Association of Australasia (MEA) was an Australian trade union which existed between 1911 and 1988. The union represented workers employed in milling grain.

Formation 

The Federation (originally the Federated Millers and Mill Employes' Association) was formed as a result of a meeting in Adelaide in May 1910. At the first annual meeting held in Melbourne in March 1911, the following officers were elected: President, Mr. T. Drum (N.S.W.); vice-president, Mr. W. Bain (S.A.); general secretary, Mr. G. Lewis (N.S.W.); treasurer, Mr. J. Nealer (Vic.); trustees, Frank Condon (S.A.) and J. Kebble. Apologies were received from the Western Australian branch.

Amalgamation 
In 1988 the M.E.A. amalgamated with the Manufacturing Grocers' Employees' Federation of Australia to form the Federated Millers and Manufacturing Grocers Union. This union then merged shortly after into the recently formed National Union of Workers.

References

Further reading 
 Taylor, Graeme (1974) Why A Small Union Survives: The case of the four millers, Melbourne:Monash University.

External links 
 nuw.org.au The website of the National Union of Workers, the successor to the Federated Millers and Mill Employees' Union.

Defunct trade unions of Australia
Food processing trade unions
Trade unions established in 1911
Trade unions disestablished in 1988